Chalcosyrphus (Chalcosyrphus) aristatus  (Johnson 1929), the Black-dented Leafwalker, is a very rare, species of syrphid fly observed in the Northeastern United States.  Hoverflies can remain nearly motionless while in flight. The adults are also known as flower flies for they are commonly found on flowers, from which they get both energy-giving nectar and protein-rich pollen.

Distribution
United States

References

Eristalinae
Insects described in 1929
Diptera of North America
Taxa named by Charles Willison Johnson
Hoverflies of North America